"Guiding Star" is the seventh single by the Liverpool Britpop band Cast, fronted by ex La's bassist John Power. Released on 16 June 1997 as the second single from Cast's second studio album, Mother Nature Calls (1997), the song reached number nine on the UK Singles Chart.

Track listings

UK CD1
 "Guiding Star"
 "Out of the Blue"
 "Free Me" (live)
 "Mirror Me" (live)

UK CD2
 "Guiding Star"
 "Keep It Alive"
 "Redemption Song" (live)
 "Guiding Star" (acoustic)

UK 7-inch single and European CD single
 "Guiding Star"
 "Out of the Blue"

UK cassette single
 "Guiding Star"
 "Out of the Blue"
 "Keep It Alive"

Credits and personnel
Credits are taken from the Mother Nature Calls liner notes.

Studio
 Mixed at Olympic Studios (London, England)

Cast
 John Power – writing, vocals, guitar
 Liam "Skin" Tyson – guitar
 Peter Wilkinson – bass
 Keith O'Neill – drums

Other personnel
 John Leckie – production
 Mark "Spike" Stent – mixing

Charts

References

1997 singles
1997 songs
Cast (band) songs
Polydor Records singles
Song recordings produced by John Leckie
Songs written by John Power (musician)